Cataño barrio-pueblo  is an urban barrio and the administrative center (seat) of Cataño, a municipality of Puerto Rico. Its population in 2010 was 4,283. It is an urban barrio located in the northeastern section of the municipality.

As was customary in Spain, in Puerto Rico, the municipality has a barrio called pueblo which contains a central plaza, the municipal buildings (city hall), and a Catholic church. Fiestas patronales (patron saint festivals) are held in the central plaza every year.

The central plaza and its church
The central plaza, or square, located in Cataño barrio-pueblo, is a place for official and unofficial recreational events and a place where people can gather and socialize from dusk to dawn. The Laws of the Indies, Spanish law, which regulated life in Puerto Rico in the early 19th century, stated the plaza's purpose was for "the parties" (celebrations, festivities), and that the square should be proportionally large enough for the number of neighbors. These Spanish regulations also stated that the streets nearby should be comfortable portals for passersby, protecting them from the elements: sun and rain.

History
In July 2020, Federal Emergency Management Agency appropriated funds for repairs to Cataño's plaza.

Features and demographics

Sectors
Barrios (which are like minor civil divisions) in turn are further subdivided into smaller local populated place areas/units called sectores (sectors in English). The types of sectores may vary, from normally sector to urbanización to reparto to barriada to residencial, among others.

The following sectors are in Cataño barrio-pueblo:

Gallery
Places in Cataño barrio-pueblo:

See also

 List of communities in Puerto Rico
 List of barrios and sectors of Cataño, Puerto Rico

References

External links

Barrios of Cataño, Puerto Rico